A by-election was held for the Australian House of Representatives seat of Flinders on 11 May 1918. This was triggered by the resignation of Nationalist MP Sir William Irvine to become Chief Justice of the Supreme Court of Victoria.

The Victorian Farmers' Union withdrew their candidate after extracting a promise from the Nationalist government to introduce preferential voting, although his name remained on the ballot paper. The by-election was won by Nationalist candidate and future Prime Minister Stanley Bruce.

Results

References

1918 elections in Australia
Victorian federal by-elections